The University of New England College of Osteopathic Medicine (UNECOM) is a private medical school in Biddeford, Maine.  Founded in 1978, the college is part of the University of New England and grants two degrees: the Doctor of Osteopathic Medicine (D.O.) degree and a Master of Medical Education Leadership. According to U.S. News & World Report, UNECOM graduates the 6th most physicians of any U.S. medical school that go on to practice in a primary care specialty.

UNECOM is accredited by the Commission on Osteopathic College Accreditation (COCA) and by the Commission on Institutions of Higher Education of the New England Commission of Higher Education.

History
The college was founded in 1978 by the New England Osteopathic Foundation.  The following year, 1979, the New England College of Osteopathic Medicine merged with St. Francis College to create the University of New England. The medical school was originally housed in Stella Maris Hall, but in 1996, with the opening of Harold Alfond Center for Health Sciences the majority of classwork for the first and second years were transferred to the Alfond Center while Administration and Faculty Offices continued to be housed in Stella Marris Hall. In August 2013, UNECOM opened Leonard Hall, a new classroom space for first and second year medical courses.

In 1996, the University of New England merged with Westbrook College. The campus of the former Westbrook College is now known as the UNE Portland Campus, and it houses UNE's Westbrook College of Health Professions, College of Pharmacy, and College of Dental Medicine. UNE has now become one of a handful of private universities with a comprehensive health education mission including medicine, pharmacy, dental medicine, nursing and an array of allied health professions.

Mission
To educate "health care leaders who advance patient-centered, high-quality osteopathic primary care, research and community health for the people of Maine, New England, and the nation."

Academics
The first and second years of the DO program consist of the basic sciences, along with structured, standardized patient encounters, while the third and fourth years consist of clinical clerkships in hospitals and clinics throughout New England and the Mid-Atlantic States.

Each third year student is required to complete 6-week rotations in Family Medicine, Obstetrics & Gynecology, Psychiatry, Surgery, and Pediatrics, as well as a 12-week rotation in Internal Medicine.  Fourth year students are required to complete 4-week clerkships in emergency medicine, osteopathic manipulative medicine, a surgical subspecialty, a subspecialty of pediatrics or internal medicine, and rural health, through Maine's AHEC program.  Students are then free to complete 19 weeks of electives in any specialty they want.  Students are free to do all of their fourth year rotations throughout the United States.

In addition to the DO degree, students at UNECOM may complete Masters in Public Health or a Master of Science in Medical Education Leadership (MMEL).  The college also offers fellowships in anatomy and osteopathic manipulative medicine.

See also
 List of medical schools in the United States

References

External links
 UNECOM website

Universities and colleges in York County, Maine
Osteopathic medical schools in the United States
Educational institutions established in 1978
Education in Biddeford, Maine
University of New England (United States)
Medical schools in Maine